This is a list of the National Register of Historic Places listings in Webb County, Texas.

This is intended to be a complete list of properties and districts listed on the National Register of Historic Places in Webb County, Texas. There are five districts and five individual properties listed on the National Register in the county. One property is also a State Antiquities Landmark, and two districts contain several Recorded Texas Historic Landmarks.

Current listings

The publicly disclosed locations of National Register properties and districts may be seen in a mapping service provided.

|}

See also

National Register of Historic Places listings in Texas
Recorded Texas Historic Landmarks in Webb County

References

External links

Registered Historic Places
Webb County
Buildings and structures in Webb County, Texas